is a Japanese male volleyball player. He was part of the Japan men's national volleyball team at the 2010 FIVB Volleyball Men's World Championship in Italy. Currently, he plays for Toray Arrows on the club level.

Clubs
  Toray Arrows (2007–)

References

1984 births
Living people
Japanese men's volleyball players
People from Saitama Prefecture
Sportspeople from Saitama Prefecture
Asian Games medalists in volleyball
Volleyball players at the 2010 Asian Games
Volleyball players at the 2014 Asian Games
Medalists at the 2010 Asian Games
Medalists at the 2014 Asian Games
Asian Games gold medalists for Japan
Asian Games silver medalists for Japan